Shahanshah was the Shirvanshah from  to . 

He was a son of Shirvanshah Manuchihr III. He had had three brothers, Akhsitan I, Afridun II, and Farrukhzad I. It has been proposed that Manuchihr III may have divided his kingdom amongst his sons upon his death, due to coin mints demonstrating the coinciding reign of Akhsitan I, Shahanshah, Afridun II and his son Fariburz II. Afridun II and Fariburz II may have ruled in the western part of the kingdom, while coin mints of Shahanshah demonstrate that he was based in Shamakhi. However, the latter has also been suggested to have been the successor of Akhsitan I.

References

Sources
 

1200s deaths
12th-century births
12th-century Iranian people
13th-century Iranian people